Dargo is a town in Victoria, Australia, located  east of Melbourne, in the Shire of Wellington. At the 2016 census, Dargo and the surrounding area had a population of 99. The median age of residents was 63.

The town provided a stopover for Victorian Gold Rush miners on their way to the goldfields of Grant, Talbotville, and Crooked River. The Post Office opened on 18 March 1868.

Today the town is a producer of timber and beef cattle, and outside these industries tourism has become a major source of revenue. The town is a popular destination for four-wheel drive enthusiasts, bushwalkers, sambar deer hunters, and trout fishermen. An annual Walnut Festival formerly ran through the Australian Easter holiday period and was usually well attended.

References

External links
Australian Places - Dargo

Towns in Victoria (Australia)
Shire of Wellington
Alpine Shire